RiverBlue is a 2017 documentary film that chronicles a three-year, around-the-world river journey by paddler and conservationist Mark Angelo during which he uncovered and documented the pollution impacts of the global fashion industry. The explores the fashion sector, from denim to leather to fast fashion, as one of the world's most polluting industries.

Reception 
RiverBlue was screened in theaters and film festivals around the world won several international awards, including the 2017 Best Documentary Feature at the Raindance Film Festival. The film was also honored at the 2018 World Water Forum in Brasilia, where it was presented with the AFD Best Film Award (sponsored by the French Development Agency) and the Green Drop Award honoring the film from 2017 that best promoted sustainability.

References 

2017 films
Canadian documentary films
2010s English-language films
2010s Canadian films